Pendil was a racehorse trained by Fred Winter. In 2012 Robin Oakley included him in his book Britain and Ireland's Top 100 Racehorses of All Time.

Pendil was a dual King George VI Chase winner at Kempton Park and was ridden on both occasions by Richard Pitman in 1972 and 1973.

One of Pendil's greatest performances was when carrying top weight of 12'7 to victory in the Massey Ferguson Gold Cup Handicap Chase at Cheltenham in December 1973 gaining revenge on The Dikler, who had pipped him on the line nine months earlier in the Cheltenham Gold Cup.

References

Further reading
 
 
 
 

Steeplechase racehorses
1965 racehorse births
1994 racehorse deaths
Racehorses bred in the United Kingdom
Racehorses trained in the United Kingdom
Cheltenham Festival winners
Thoroughbred family 9-c